Pavlina Evro (born 22 January 1965) is a retired Albanian mid-distance and long-distance runner athlete.

Born in Korçë, Albania she specialized in the mid-distances of 800m and 1500m. She is the most famous Albanian athlete for her extraordinary results. She was champion of Albania and is still the record holder for those specialties in Albania after 26 years.

Evro will be remembered internationally for having ranked first place in the 1500 meter race at the "Grand Prix" International Athletic Meeting in Nice, France in 1984  and for winning a bronze medal in the 1500 metres at the 1987 Mediterranean Games in Latakia, Syria.

References

Further reading

1965 births
Living people
Sportspeople from Korçë
Albanian female middle-distance runners
Albanian female long-distance runners
Athletes (track and field) at the 1987 Mediterranean Games
Mediterranean Games bronze medalists for Albania
Mediterranean Games medalists in athletics
Albanian female cross country runners